The Sony FE 70-200mm F4.0 G OSS is a full-frame constant maximum aperture, telephoto zoom lens for the Sony E-mount, announced by Sony in 2013.

The 70-200mm F4.0 G lens is popular among weight-sensitive landscape photographers and hobbyists who want G-lens quality without spending thousands of dollars on a heavier, faster aperture telephoto lens.

Though designed for Sony's full frame E-mount cameras, the lens can be used on Sony's APS-C E-mount camera bodies, with an equivalent full-frame field-of-view of 105-300mm.

Build quality
The lens showcases an off-white weather resistant plastic and metal exterior with a rubber focus and zoom ring. On the side of the lens is a set of external controls for enabling image stabilization, limiting the focal range of the lens, and changing focusing modes. It also features three external focus-hold buttons for locking in focus on a subject in motion. The lens maintains its physical length throughout its zoom range.

The lens is not compatible with Sony's 1.4x and 2.0x teleconvertors. It is physically impossible to properly mount them to the lens mount without damaging the rear lens element.

Image quality
The lens is exceptionally sharp throughout its zoom range, with only a slight fall-off in acuity toward the edges of the frame at faster apertures. Distortion, vignetting, and chromatic aberration are all well controlled.

See also
List of Sony E-mount lenses
Sony FE 70-200mm F2.8 GM OSS
Sony FE 70-300mm F4.5-5.6 G OSS
Sony a-mount 70-200mm f2.8 G SSM
Sony a-mount 70-200mm f2.8 G SSM II

References

Camera lenses introduced in 2014
70-200